is a Japanese manga series written and illustrated by Takuma Yokota. It was serialized in Shueisha's Weekly Shōnen Jump from May 2015 to February 2017 and published in ten volumes.

Publication
Written and illustrated by Takuma Yokota, Straighten Up! Welcome to Shika High's Competitive Dance Club ran in Shueisha's  Weekly Shōnen Jump from May 11, 2015, to February 13, 2017. The series' individual chapters were collected into ten tankōbon volumes. A spin-off chapter was released in Weekly Shōnen Jump on April 11, 2016.

Viz Media published the series in English in their digital magazine Weekly Shonen Jump as part of their Jump Start initiative.

Volume list

Reception
In 2016, the series won the Next Manga Award in the print manga category. In a 2017 poll by the Anime! Anime! website, the series ranked first on the list of the top ten completed manga people want to receive an anime adaptation.

References

External links
  at Weekly Shōnen Jump 
 

Dance in anime and manga
Shōnen manga
Shueisha manga
Viz Media manga